Herramélluri (Basque for 'Herramel's villa') is a village in the province and autonomous community of La Rioja, Spain. It is named after Herramel, a lord in the 10th century.

References

Populated places in La Rioja (Spain)